Jay Jon Christopher Smith (born 29 April 1981 in Helsingborg, Sweden) is a Swedish singer and guitarist. He won the Swedish Idol 2010 title, beating Minnah Karlsson in the 10 December 2010 final in the Ericsson Globe theater. Jay Smith also plays in the band Von Benzo, which has released two studio albums.

During Idol 2010, he created controversy announcing that he had smoked marijuana at one point during the program series. In an article in Expressen, Smith said that he could be sentenced to a fine for a minor drug offence. Conversely, TV4 television station allowed him to stay in the competition, provided he would not use drugs again during the show.

Smith's first solo single was "Dreaming People". He released his debut album, the self-titled Jay Smith, on 19 December 2010. The album shot straight to number one in its first week of release on the Swedish Albums Chart. It subsequently placed at number nine on the Swedish year-end chart. The album was also certified Platinum soon after its release.

Smith also appears in the two compilation album from Idol 2010, singing the song "All I Need Is You".

Discography

With Von Benzo

Albums
 Von Benzo (2009)
 Yes Kids It's True (2011)

Singles
 Die Beautiful (2009)
 Bad Father, Bad Son (2009)
 Radio (2011)
 Addicted (2013)

Solo

Albums
 Jay Smith (2010)
 King Of Man (2013)
Young Guns (2019)

Singles
 Dreaming People (2010)
 All I Need is You (2010)
 King Of Man (2013)
 Ode To Death (Little Sister) (2013)
 Keeps Me Alive  (2014)
 God Damn You (2015)
 Neverneverland (2015)
 Out Of Life (2016)
 Boomerang (with Smash Into Pieces) (2017)
 Ten Feet Off The Ground (2018)
 Roots (2018)
 Let My Heart Go (2018)
 My Everything (2018)
 Closing Time (2019）
 The End (feat Maja Gullstrand) (2022)

Collaborations
 Det bästa från Idol 2010 – Audition (2010)
 Det bästa från Idol 2010 (2010)

References

External links
Jay Smith Official website

1981 births
21st-century Swedish singers
Idol (Swedish TV series) winners
Living people
Musicians from Skåne County
People from Helsingborg
Swedish guitarists
Male guitarists
21st-century guitarists
21st-century Swedish male singers